John Cragg Farthing (13 December 1861 – 6 May 1947) was the Anglican Bishop of Montreal for 30 years during the first half of the twentieth century.

Early life and education
John Cragg Farthing was born in Toronto to an upper-class Anglican family. He had a sister Ann Cragg Farthing. He was educated at Caius College, Cambridge, England. Ann Farthing became an Anglican missionary, working in the United States territory of Alaska for years during the early 20th century in the Yukon interior.

Clergyman
After Farthing's return to Canada from Cambridge, he was ordained and embarked on an ecclesiastical career with a curacy at Woodstock, Ontario, swiftly followed by elevation to vicar within the same parish.

Promotion followed rapidly and he was, successively, called as a Canon of St Paul's Cathedral, London, Ontario, and Dean of Ontario. He left Ontario when called in 1909 as Bishop of Montreal, serving until 1939. A keen observer of Montreal life, he was a moderate prelate.

Marriage and family
He married Mary Kemp. They had one child, a son John Farthing, who became a philosopher.

Arms

See also
List of Anglican Bishops of Montreal

References

External links
 

1861 births
1947 deaths
Alumni of Gonville and Caius College, Cambridge
Anglican bishops of Montreal
20th-century Anglican Church of Canada bishops
Deans of Ontario